Bear Pit is a 2000 novel from Australian author Jon Cleary. It was the seventeenth book featuring Sydney detective Scobie Malone and involves the assassination of the State Premier by a sniper in the lead up to the 2000 Sydney Olympics.

Cleary says he was inspired to write the book by the Australian political scene. "I can't remember people being as disillusioned with politics in Australia as they are now," he said in 2000.

References

External links
National Library of Australia - The Bear Pit by Jon Cleary

2000 Australian novels
Novels set in Sydney
2000 Summer Olympics
HarperCollins books
William Morrow and Company books
Novels by Jon Cleary